Meridian 4, also known as Meridian No.14L, is a Russian military communications satellite. It was launched atop a Soyuz-2-1a/Fregat rocket from the Plesetsk Cosmodrome in May 2011.

It is the fourth satellite to be launched as part of the Meridian system to replace the older Molniya series. It was constructed by ISS Reshetnev and is believed to be based on the Uragan-M satellite bus, which has also been used for GLONASS navigation satellites.

Meridian satellites are launched into highly elliptical Molniya orbits to provide communications coverage of the Northern Hemisphere for the Russian military.

See also

 2011 in spaceflight

References

External links
 Nasa Spaceflight.com

Meridian satellites
Spacecraft launched in 2011
2011 in Russia
Spacecraft launched by Soyuz-2 rockets